Exile is a Canadian drama film, directed by Charles-Olivier Michaud and released in 2012. The film stars Francis Cleophat as Samuel, a teenager in Haiti who is left alone after his father is kidnapped by government forces; learning that his mother whom he had long been told was dead is in fact still alive and merely ran off to the United States, he embarks on a quest to find her, and is helped by various "guardian angels" as he travels to Miami, New York City and Montreal in his search.

The film's cast also includes Paul Doucet, Julie Le Breton, Stephen McHattie, Maxime Dumontier and Ralph Prosper, and includes narration by writer and broadcaster Stanley Péan.

Brendan Kelly of the Montreal Gazette reviewed the film favourably, writing that although the film's plot posed possible suspension of disbelief problems in the way Samuel is continually protected in his journey, the film was clearly meant to be seen as an allegory for Samuel's passage into manhood.

The film premiered at the Abitibi-Témiscamingue International Film Festival in 2012, before opening commercially in June 2014.

Michel Corriveau received a Jutra Award nomination for Best Original Music at the 17th Jutra Awards in 2015.

References

External links

2012 films
English-language Canadian films
Canadian coming-of-age drama films
Black Canadian films
Films directed by Charles-Olivier Michaud
French-language Canadian films
2010s English-language films
2010s Canadian films